Ritesh Agarwal is an Indian entrepreneur who is a founder and CEO of OYO Rooms.

Early years 
Ritesh Agarwal was born in a Marathi family in Bissam Cuttack, Odisha, India and brought up in Titilagarh. He comes from a family that used to run a small shop in Southern Odisha city called Rayagada and his schooling was completed from Sacred Heart School in Rayagada. At the age of 13, he started selling SIM cards. He graduated from St. Johns Senior Secondary School, Bundi Road, Kota, Rajasthan and moved to Delhi in 2011 for college. He dropped out of college, and was selected for the Thiel Fellowship (started by Peter Thiel) in 2013. Agarwal's father died in 2023 after falling from a height.

Career
Agarwal started a budget accommodation portal, Oravel Stays, for booking budget hotels. It was accepted into the accelerator program by Venture Nursery in September 2012, and later was one of the winners of the 2013 Thiel Fellowship program, receiving a grant of $100,000. The company was launched as OYO Rooms in May 2013.

By September 2018, the company raised $1 billion. In July 2019, it was reported that Agarwal purchased $2 billion in shares in the company, tripling his stake. 

His net worth in 2020 was estimated to be approximately $1.1 billion (₹7253 crore) according to Hurun Rich List 2020. As of February 2020, he is the youngest self made billionaire in the world. 

He is listed in the Forbes 30 under 30 list for Asia.

Awards 
In June 2022, he was recognised by the International Hospitality Institute on the Global 100 in Hospitality, a list featuring the 100 Most Powerful People in Global Hospitality.

Controversies

An Allegation of cheating by Oyo's co-founder
Agarwal is accused of cheating Oyo's co-founder, Manish Sinha, during the early period of the company.

Fine in USA
Agarwal signed agreements through his company OYO with hotel owners in the US in which the buildings of the owners will be rebranded under the OYO name in exchange of compensation and guarantee income but left out the information that OYO is not authorized to operate franchise business in the state of California for which in March 2019, OYO was fined $200,000 by California regulators. The company also received a cease and desist order from Washington, after regulators found OYO made offers to many hotel owners and managers, without proper registration.

Allegations of fraud 
In September 2020, a case was lodged against Agarwal in Dera Bassi by a Chandigarh-based businessman for fraud and conspiracy under IPC 420 (cheating) 120 B (criminal conspiracy).

OYO faced backlash from 10,000 hotel owners in India. According to them, OYO takes up half or more of the revenues through fees that are not disclosed at the time when the hotels join OYO. 

According to an October 2019 report, police cases were filed against OYO by hotel operators in Bangalore, Mysore, and other cities of Karnataka accusing Agarwal of fraud. The latter, however, successfully appealed for a stay order on one case in Bangalore.

References

External links

1993 births
 Living people
Indian businesspeople
People from Rayagada district
Businesspeople from Odisha
Thiel fellows